Government Springs Park is a park located in Enid, Oklahoma. Prior to Oklahoma statehood, the park was a natural spring used by Native Americans, and later soldiers and cattle drivers along the Chisholm Trail. Skeleton Ranch, (North Enid, Oklahoma) was another stop on the trail, served by stage coach lines after 1874.

A Garfield County war dead memorial is located at the northeast end of the park.
Sculptures by Harold T. Holden within the park include: Holding the Claim, Plainsman, Chisholm, Wrangler, Boomer, Pioneer, and Dressing the Bit. Time capsules honor the Enid Springs Sanitarium, and the Oklahoma Centennial.

Gallery

References

Enid, Oklahoma
Parks in Oklahoma
Protected areas of Garfield County, Oklahoma
Tourist attractions in Enid, Oklahoma